Edgbaston Reserve, formerly Edgbaston Station, is a  nature reserve in central Queensland, Australia,  north-east of Longreach.  It lies in the upper catchment of Pelican Creek, which flows into the Thomson River and, ultimately, into Lake Eyre.  It lies within the Great Artesian Basin and is notable for its many artesian springs and their plants and animals.  It is owned and managed by Bush Heritage Australia (BHA), by which it was purchased in 2008.  The reserve is within the Bush Heritage anchor region, the Queensland Uplands and Brigalow Belt.

History
Edgbaston was a pastoral lease until acquisition by BHA.  Purchase of the property was assisted by a contribution from the Australian Government's Maintaining Australia's Biodiversity Hotspots program.

Landscape
As well as the artesian springs and their associated freshwater wetlands, the reserve's landscape includes grassy eucalypt woodlands and rocky escarpments.

Fauna
Edgbaston's springs contain two nationally threatened fish species, the Edgbaston Goby and the Red-finned Blue-eye, as well as many rare and geographically restricted species of invertebrates and plants.

References

External links
 Bush Heritage Australia

Bush Heritage Australia reserves
Nature reserves in Queensland
2008 establishments in Australia